Dongguan Library is a prefecture-level city public library in Dongguan, Guangdong province, People's Republic of China.

Dongguan Library was officially open on September 28, 2005. It has an area of 44,654 square meters and ranks first in prefecture-level cities. There are ten libraries and over 20 service points in Dongguan Library, including the first Comic Library on Mainland China, the first domestic Self-Service Library, the Library of Daily Life, Dongguan Local Collections, Taiwan Local Collections, and so on. Under the guideline of developing together with regional libraries, Dongguan has implemented the center-branch library system. By June 2010, Dongguan had established one Central Library, 47 branches and 102 service stations, and achieved the goal of 24/7 services which covers 32 towns in the city.

Self-Service Library
In September 2005, Dongguan launched the first Self-service Library in China. It houses a Self Checkout and a collection of more than 10,000 volumes of books. The Self-Service Library, which provides 24-hour services every day, enables people to borrow, return, and read books even when the main hall is closed.

In December 2007, they set up the first library ATM (self-service book station) of China in Dongguan. Each library ATM device stores 500-1000 books, with which readers can borrow and return books automatically. By the end of 2009, seven library ATMs were placed in residential areas, hospitals, squares, branch libraries to serve people.

References

External links
HelloDongguan.com

Buildings and structures in Dongguan
Libraries in Guangdong
Public libraries in China
Libraries established in 2005
2005 establishments in China